The 2017–18 Ashes series (named Magellan Ashes Series for sponsorship reasons) was a series of Test cricket matches contested between England and Australia for The Ashes. The series was played at five venues across Australia between 23 November 2017 and 8 January 2018. England were the defending holders of the Ashes going into the series, having won in 2015. Australia won the series 4–0, regaining The Ashes after taking an unassailable lead with an innings victory in the third Test.

Squads

In September 2017, Ben Stokes was named in the initial England squad, but was subsequently ruled out of international selection until further notice while a disciplinary process took place. The following month, he was withdrawn from the Ashes squad, pending an investigation, with Steven Finn added to England's squad. However, Finn himself was then ruled out of the tour, injuring his knee prior to the first warm-up game. Tom Curran was called up to replace him. James Anderson was named as England's vice-captain for the Test series in Stokes' absence. George Garton was added to England's squad as cover for Jake Ball during pre-Test tour matches, but returned to the England Lions when Ball recovered in time for the first Test.

Australia delayed naming its squad for the first two Tests until 17 November 2017, selecting Cameron Bancroft to replace Matthew Renshaw. Tim Paine returned to the team after a seven-year absence, ahead of Matthew Wade and Peter Nevill. Before the first Test, Glenn Maxwell was added to Australia's squad as cover for David Warner, who injured his neck at training. Mitchell Marsh was later added to Australia's squad ahead of the third Test, replacing Chadd Sayers.

Australia's Mitchell Starc and England's Craig Overton were both ruled out of the fourth Test, with heel and rib injuries respectively. Maxwell was replaced by Ashton Agar for the fifth Test. England's Chris Woakes was ruled out of the fifth Test due to injury.

Venues

The five venues were the Gabba, Adelaide Oval, the WACA Ground, the Melbourne Cricket Ground and the Sydney Cricket Ground.

The WACA Ground was expected to host its final Test during the series, prior to the opening of the new Optus Stadium. However, it was said in November 2015 that construction of the new stadium was well ahead of schedule and the Perth Test could be hosted at the new venue. A decision on the venue was made in May 2017, with the WACA Ground confirmed as the venue, as the new stadium would not be ready in time.

In December 2016, Cricket Australia (CA) were looking at hosting the first day/night Ashes match, with Adelaide being the likely venue. On 12 December 2016, it was confirmed that Adelaide Oval would host the first day/night Ashes Test.

Matches

First Test

Second Test

Third Test

Fourth Test

Fifth Test

Broadcasting
The series was broadcast on television in Australia by the Nine Network. As part of a five-year deal with Cricket Australia that commenced in 2016, BT Sport provided television coverage of the series in the United Kingdom and Ireland.

References

External links
The Ashes 2017/18 - Fixtures and Results ESPN Cricinfo

The Ashes
International cricket competitions in 2017–18
Ashes series
Ashes series
Ashes
Ashes
Ashes
Ashes